Maurice Rostand (26 May 1891 – 21 February 1968) was a French author, the son of the poet and dramatist Edmond Rostand and the poet Rosemonde Gérard, and brother of the biologist Jean Rostand.

Rostand was a writer of poems, novels, and plays. He was friends with Jean Cocteau and Lucien Daudet and was one of the homosexual personalities who frequented the salons during the period between the wars.

In 1948, he published his memoirs, Confession d'un demi-siècle. He is interred in Passy Cemetery.

Works

Plays
 La Gloire, 1921
 La Mort de Molière, Théâtre Sarah Bernhardt, 1922
 Le Masque de fer, 1923
 Le Secret du Sphinx, pièce en 4 actes, 1924
 Monsieur de Letoriere: Piece en Quatre Actes et Cinq Tableaux en Vers, 1931
 Le procès d'Oscar Wilde, 1935

Some works were written in collaboration with his mother, Rosemonde Gérard.

Other
 Les Insomnies Poemes 1914–1923, 1923
 L'homme que j'ai tué, 1925
 Confession d'un demi-siècle, 1948
 Sarah Bernhardt, 1950

Biography
 Marcel Migeo: Les Rostand, Paris, Stock, 1973. About Edmond, Rosemonde, Jean and Maurice Rostand.

References

External links

 
 

1891 births
1946 deaths
Burials at Passy Cemetery
20th-century French dramatists and playwrights
20th-century French novelists
French LGBT dramatists and playwrights
French LGBT poets
French LGBT novelists
French male poets
French male novelists
20th-century French poets
20th-century French male writers
French gay writers